Hymenopenaeus furici is a species of prawn in the family Solenoceridae. They live in the Western Indian Ocean near Madagascar, with a depth range from 1000 to 1525 meters deep.

References 

Crustaceans described in 1978
Crustaceans of the Indian Ocean

Solenoceridae